ANALOG Computing was an American computer magazine devoted to the Atari 8-bit family of home computers. It was published from 1981 until 1989. In addition to reviews and tutorials, ANALOG printed multiple programs in each issue for users to type in. The magazine had a reputation for   machine language games—much smoother than those written in Atari BASIC—and which were uncommon in competing magazines. Such games were accompanied by the assembly language source code.

The title began as an acronym for Atari Newsletter And Lots Of Games, but that was only spelled out in the first two issues. Originally the title as printed on the cover was A.N.A.L.O.G. 400/800 Magazine, but by the eighth issue it changed to A.N.A.L.O.G. Computing.  Though the dots remained in the logo, it was simply referred to as ANALOG or ANALOG Computing inside the magazine.

ANALOG also sold commercial games, two books of type-in software, and access to a custom bulletin-board system. After the Atari ST was released, coverage of the new systems eventually moved to a separate publication: ST-Log.

While the program listings were covered under the magazine's copyright protections, users were granted the right to type them into their computer for personal use, so long as they were not sold or copied.

History
ANALOG was co-launched by Lee H. Pappas and Michael DesChesnes who met at a Star Trek convention in 1978. The first issue of the magazine was January / February 1981. It was published bi-monthly through the November / December 1983 issue and then monthly beginning with the January 1984 issue.

When the Atari ST was announced in 1985, it was initially covered in ANALOG, and a supplementary section, ST-Log, was eventually included within ANALOG. With its 10th issue, ST-Log became a separate magazine with ANALOG fully devoted to the Atari 8-bit computer line. (This paralleled STart magazine being spun off from Antic.)

In 1988, Pappas announced in an ST-Log editorial that both it and ANALOG Computing were under new ownership of LFP Inc. and the offices moved from Worcester, Massachusetts to North Hollywood, California. The relocation resulted in circulation being interrupted between issues 58 and 59 (from October 1987 to March 1988). Subscribers were not told ahead of time; it was announced in the Editorial section of ANALOG issue 59.

In the September 1989 issues of both ANALOG and ST-Log, it was announced that the two magazines would be recombined into a single Atari resource under the ANALOG name, beginning with the November issue. Two issues of the combined magazine were published before LFP Inc. shut it down. STart magazine reported this, incorrectly claiming that both magazines were dropped less than a month after the announcement, but correctly reporting that production staff merged into another publication owned by Pappas, Video Games & Computer Entertainment. The final issue of ANALOG Computing  was December 1989, #79. There was no mention that this would be the last issue.

Additional products

ANALOG Software

In its early years, ANALOG Computing sold games via mail order under the name ANALOG Software. Several of these were written by magazine staff members. Some games were advertised, but never completed or published, such as Sunday Driver and Titan.

Released games
 Crash Dive (different from the Brian Moriarty text adventure printed as a type-in listing)
 Star Sentry
 Buried Bucks
 Race in Space, later printed as a type-in listing in the magazine
 Carnival, licensed from Sega

Books
ANALOG published two books of program listings and tutorials. The ANALOG Compendium (1983) contains "the best Atari home computer programs from the first ten issues." An Atari 8-bit Extra from ANALOG Computing (1987) contains previously unpublished programs.

The ANALOG Computing Pocket Reference Card was published in 1985 and sold for US$7.95. It contains a summary of Atari BASIC commands, player/missile memory layout, hardware register and operating system addresses, ATASCII characters, graphics modes, and other information.

Bulletin board
The ANALOG Computing Telecommunications System, or ANALOG Computing TCS, was a custom bulletin board system accessible only through paid subscription. After the TCS launched, an 8-page ANALOG Computing TCS Guide was bound into an issue of the magazine.

ANALOG Computing writers

Staff
 Lee Pappas
Tom Hudson
 Brian Moriarty
 Clayton Walnum

Contributors
Charles F. Johnson
 Russ Wetmore

See also 
 Antic, the other major Atari magazine in the US
 Atari User, a British Atari magazine
 Page 6, one of the longest running Atari magazines

References

External links 
 ANALOG Computing at Classic Computer Magazine Archive
 ANALOG Computing archive at Cyberroach.com (archive.org)
ANALOG Computing on the Internet Archive
 ST-Log at Classic Computer Magazine Archive

Magazines established in 1981
Magazines disestablished in 1989
Magazines published in Massachusetts
1981 establishments in Massachusetts
1989 disestablishments in California
Bimonthly magazines published in the United States
Monthly magazines published in the United States
Atari 8-bit computer magazines